Desafío (Spanish for "challenge") may refer to:

 Desafío (TV series)
 El Desafío, a 1995 Venezuelan telenovela directed by Renato Gutiérrez
 Desafío (album), by various artists, 2003
 "Desafío (intro)", the album's title track
 Desafío, a 2006 album by Malú
 "Desafío", the album's title track
 Desafíos, a 2015 album by 
 "Desafío", a song by Arca from Arca
 "Desafío", a song by Jory Boy featuring Maluma
 "Desafío", a song by 
 "Desafío", a song by Ximena Sariñana from No Todo Lo Puedes Dar
 "El Desafío", a song by Jose el Pillo and Daddy Yankee

See also